The Bucknell Bison men's basketball team represents Bucknell University in Lewisburg, Pennsylvania in NCAA Division I competition. The school's team competes in the Patriot League and plays home games in Sojka Pavilion.

Bucknell began varsity intercollegiate competition in men's basketball in 1896. The Bison were retroactively recognized as the pre-NCAA tournament national champion for the 1900–01 season by the Premo-Porretta Power Poll.

Postseason
Bucknell has appeared in 11 postseason tournaments, with three wins in total. In 2005, Bucknell defeated #3 seed Kansas in the first round as a #14 seed, in the biggest upset of the 2005 NCAA Tournament. They received the award for "Best Upset" at the 2005 ESPY Awards. The following year, they received a #9 seed (highest in Patriot League history) and defeated the #8 seeded Arkansas in the first round.

NCAA tournament results
The Bison have appeared in eight NCAA Tournaments. Their combined record is 2–8.

From 2011–2015 the round of 64 was known as the Second Round

NIT results
The Bison have appeared in the National Invitation Tournament (NIT) three times. Their record is 1–3.

Seasons

Records

Award winners

Conference Player of the Year

Conference Coach of the Year

Retired numbers 
The Bison have retired three jersey numbers in program history.

NBA draft 
Bucknell has had three players drafted into the National Basketball Association (NBA). Mike Muscala is the only current active Bison playing in the NBA.

Bisons in international leagues 

 Bryan Cohen (born 1989), American-Israeli basketball player
Nate Sestina (born 1997), basketball player in the Israeli Basketball Premier League

References

External links